Punctum ugandanum is a species of terrestrial gastropod belonging to the family Punctidae.

The species is found in Uganda and Kenya (Mount Kenya).

References

Punctidae
Gastropods of Africa
Molluscs described in 1903
Taxa named by Edgar Albert Smith